Princess Mathilde may refer to:

 Princess Mathilde Caroline of Bavaria (1813–1862)
 Princess Mathilde Sophie of Oettingen-Oettingen and Oettingen-Spielberg (1816–1886)
 Mathilde Bonaparte (1820–1904)
 Princess Mathilde of Saxony (born 1863) (1863–1933)
 Princess Mathilde of Bavaria (1877–1906)
 Princess Mathilde, Duchess of Brabant (born 1973)